is a Japanese animation studio established on December 19, 2000, by former Triangle Staff members in Suginami, Tokyo. It has been involved in the development of many series, predominantly contributing to other studios and adapting works based on light novels and manga. It is a subsidiary of OB Planning, which handles executive production on many of its series. A.C.G.T also works regularly with production company Genco, which at times provides executive production while A.C.G.T completes animation production. In 2006, the studio's headquarters was moved from Suginami to Nerima.

Television series 
 Seven of Seven (2002)
 Duel Masters (2002, season 1 only)
 Human Crossing (2003)
 Kino's Journey (2003)
 Dear Boys (2003)
 Initial D Fourth Stage (2004)
 Koi Kaze (2004)
 Lime-iro Ryūkitan X (2005)
 Project Blue Earth SOS (2006)
 GR: Giant Robo (2007)
 Wangan Midnight (2007)
 Kimi ga Aruji de Shitsuji ga Ore de (2008)
 Monochrome Factor (2008)
 Freezing (2011)
 Freezing Vibration (2013)
 Dai-Shogun – Great Revolution (with J.C.Staff, 2014)
 Minami Kamakura High School Girls Cycling Club (with J.C.Staff, 2017)
 Dies Irae (2017)
 A Certain Scientific Accelerator (Production Cooperation with J.C.Staff, 2019)  
 Do You Love Your Mom and Her Two-Hit Multi-Target Attacks?  (Production Cooperation with J.C.Staff, 2019) 
 Orient (2022)

Original video animations 
 New Fist of the North Star (2003)
 Kino's Journey: Tower Country (2005)
 Initial D Battle Stage 2 (2007)
 Initial D Extra Stage 2: Tabidachi no Green (2008)
 Dies irae: The Dawning Days (2017)
 Dies Irae: To the Ring Reincarnation (2018)
 Do You Love Your Mom on the Shore? (Production Cooperation with J.C.Staff, 2019)

Animated films 
 Kino's Journey: Life Goes On (2005)

References

External links
  
  at OB Planning 
 

Japanese animation studios
Mass media companies established in 2000
2000 establishments in Japan
Animation studios in Tokyo
Nerima